The 1985 Grand Prix German Open (also known as the 1985 Ebel German Open for sponsorship reasons) was a men's tennis tournament played on outdoor red clay courts. It was the 77th edition of the event. It took place at the Am Rothenbaum in Hamburg, West Germany, from 29 April through 5 May 1985. Ninth-seeded Miloslav Mečíř won the singles title and earned $45,500 first-prize money.

Finals

Singles
 Miloslav Mečíř defeated  Henrik Sundström, 6–4, 6–1, 6-4
 It was Mečíř's 2nd singles title of the year and of his career.

Doubles
 Hans Gildemeister /  Andrés Gómez defeated  Heinz Günthardt /  Balázs Taróczy, 6–4, 6–3

References

External links
   
 ATP tournament profile
 ITF tournament edition details

German Open
Hamburg European Open
1985 in West German sport
German